A book prospectus is a printed description of or advertisement for that book, usually issued before publication in an attempt to generate interest and advance orders. The word derives from Latin, meaning literally something which gives a view or prospect (in this case of a book). Some prospectuses are lavishly produced, especially for private press books.

Printed advertisements for and catalogues of books were produced in Europe as early as the 1470s, although very few survive and what we recognize today as prospectuses (containing information on the text, physical nature, price and availability of a forthcoming book) did not develop until the seventeenth century, when they were generally issued for books published by subscription. Prospectuses are of great interest to the historian and bibliographer because they often give information about a book, its author, publisher, printer or illustrator which is not available elsewhere.

References

David Butcher. British private press prospectuses 1891–2001. Risbury: Whittington Press, 2001.
John P. Feather. Book prospectuses before 1801 in the John Johnson Collection: a catalogue with microfiches. Oxford: Bodleian Library, 1976.

John P. Feather. Book prospectuses before 1801 in the Gough Collection, Bodleian Library, Oxford: a catalogue with microfiches. Oxford: Bodleian Library, 1980.

Advertisements
Book publishing